The Littles (French: Les Minipouss) is an animated television series originally produced between 1983 and 1985. It is based on the characters from The Littles, a series of children's novels by American author John Peterson, the first of which was published in 1967. The series was produced for the American broadcast network ABC by the French/American studio DIC Audiovisuel. It was post-produced by a Canadian animation studio, Animation City Editorial Services.

Television history
Along with Inspector Gadget and Heathcliff and the Catillac Cats, The Littles was one of the first cartoons produced by DIC Entertainment for American television, and was the only one of the three to air on a network, rather than in syndication.

The first two seasons of shows feature The Littles around the Bigg household, but to improve the show's popularity the final season features the Littles traveling around the world.

During the production run of the show, the Littles were also popular enough to warrant two movie tie-ins:
 On May 25, 1985, the Littles starred in their first animated feature, Here Come the Littles, which serves as a prequel to the television series. It was directed by Bernard Deyriès and written by Woody Kling. This is available on DVD.
 The following year (1986), a made-for-TV movie was created starring the Littles: Liberty and the Littles. This film was also directed by Bernard Deyriès and written by Heywood Kling. It aired in three parts during the tenth season of ABC Weekend Specials. It was subsequently edited into a three-part episode and included in the third season of the series. The episode is available on DVD.

In 2003, the series began to air on the Syndicated DIC Kids Network block in order to fulfill E/I criteria. However, not every episode of the series was syndicated during this run.

The series also broadcast in the United Kingdom on TVAM and in Australia on Network 10. Many other countries also picked up the series.

Characters

The Little family
 Tom Little – The older of the two Little children.
 Lucy Little – The younger of the two Little children.
 Grandpa Little – The oldest member of the family.
 Dinky Little – A cousin of the family (as in the books, where he is always presented as 'cousin Dinky').
 Frank Little – the father in the family.
 Helen Little – the mother in the family and the daughter of Grandpa Little.
 Ashley Little – A second, younger cousin of the family.

In the television series, the family tree is mostly clear. Frank and Helen are the parents of Tom and Lucy, Grandpa is the father of Helen, and Dinky is a cousin (on Helen's side, as said by Grandpa in the episode "Ben Dinky") of Tom and Lucy. In the books, the family tree is never explicitly identified. The Littles that often appear are Tom, Lucy, Dinky and Grandpa.

Supporting characters
 Henry Bigg – A 13-year-old boy and one of the few humans who knows about the existence of the Littles. They live in his house and are his best friends 
 Slick – A little turtle and Henry's pet.

Villains
 Dr. Erick Hunter – He has never seen a Little with his own eyes, but is very sure they really exist. His job is to find some evidence and build machines that can detect these tiny humans to prove to the others and himself that the Littles really exist. 
 James Peterson – the other bad guy and Dr. Hunter's assistant.

Other characters
 Mr. and Mrs. Bigg – Henry's parents. Both archeologists, they often go on journeys. 
 Marie – Henry's classmate and close friend.

Voices
 Jimmy E. Keegan as Henry Bigg
 Alvy Moore as Grandpa Little
 Gregg Berger as Frank Little
 Patricia Parris as Helen Little
 Donavan Freberg as Tom Little (seasons 1–2)
 David Wagner as Tom Little (season 3)
 Bettina Bush as Lucy Little
 B.J. Ward as Ashley Little (seasons 2–3)
 Frank Welker as Slick (season 1)
 Pat Fraley as Slick (seasons 2–3)
 Robert David Hall as Mr. Bigg and Dinky Little
 Laurel Page as Mrs. Bigg
 Ken Sansom as Dr. Hunter and Peterson (seasons 1–2)

Rachelle Cano provides the opening and closing theme vocals

Additional voices
 Candace Craig
 Paul Eiding
 Jonathan Goldsmith
 David Hollander
 Erv Immerman
 Tress MacNeille
 Mona Marshall
 Julie McWhirter
 Hal Smith - Mr. Finnegan (in "When Irish Eyes are Smiling")
 Marilyn Schreffler
 John Stephenson
 Russi Taylor

Crew
 Marsha Goodman - Voice Director (Season Three), Talent Coordinator
 Ginny McSwain - Voice Director (Season Two)

Episodes
A dagger (†) denotes an episode that was not rerun in syndication.

Season 1 (1983)

Season 2 (1984)

Season 3 (1985)

Home media releases

Other merchandise
Some of the merchandise that was released during the series run included: tie-in story books, a Milton Bradley board game, stickers and greeting cards. Foreign merchandise included many more items such as Halloween Masks, a set of figures, card game, VHS videos, records, and more.

See also

 Here Come the Littles, 1985 animated feature film

References

External links
 The Littles episode guide
 
 

1983 American television series debuts
1985 American television series endings
1980s American animated television series
1983 French television series debuts
1980s French animated television series
American children's animated adventure television series
American children's animated fantasy television series
American television shows based on children's books
French children's animated adventure television series
French children's animated fantasy television series
French television shows based on children's books
Animated series based on novels
Anime-influenced Western animated television series
Animated television series about children
Animated television series about families
Disney Channel original programming
First-run syndicated television programs in the United States
Television series by DIC Entertainment
American Broadcasting Company original programming
ABC Weekend Special
English-language television shows